Pusan National University Station is a station of Busan Metro Line 1 in Jangjeon-dong, Geumjeong District, Busan, South Korea.

Station Layout

External links

  Cyber station information from Busan Transportation Corporation

Busan Metro stations
Geumjeong District
Railway stations in South Korea opened in 1985